Winston Conrad "Wink" Martindale (born December 4, 1933) is an American disc jockey, radio personality, game show host, and television producer. In his six-decade career, he is best known for hosting Gambit from 1972 to 1976 (and again from 1980 to 1981), Tic-Tac-Dough from 1978 to 1985, High Rollers from 1987 to 1988, and Debt from 1996 to 1998.

Career

Radio
Martindale was born in Jackson, Tennessee, and started his career as a disc jockey at age 17 at WPLI in Jackson, earning $25 a week.

After moving to WTJS, he was hired away for double the salary by Jackson's only other station, WDXI. He next hosted mornings at WHBQ in Memphis while a college student at Memphis State University, graduating with a Bachelor of Science degree in 1957. While there, Martindale became a member of the Kappa Sigma Fraternity.

On the evening of July 10, 1954, he was showing the WHBQ studio to some friends when he realized that his colleague on the 9 p.m. to midnight shift, Dewey Phillips, was getting a lot of reactions from listeners after airing a new song. That song was Elvis Presley's first record, "That's All Right", recorded at Sam Phillips' recording studio on the evening of July 5, 1954. Sam, who had brought the record on July 6, was in the WHBQ studio on the first airing night and had Elvis' telephone number. DJ Dewey Phillips wanted to interview Elvis during his program, so Wink endeavored to contact Elvis, but his mother Gladys answered the phone and said Elvis was so nervous that he had gone to a movie theater. Gladys and her husband Vernon brought Elvis to WHBQ and Dewey interviewed Elvis without his knowing that he was on the air (Martindale reports that Elvis later admitted that he would have been unable to talk otherwise).

Martindale's rendition of the spoken-word song "Deck of Cards" went to No. 7 on the Billboard Hot 100 chart and sold over a million copies in 1959. It also peaked at no. 5 in the UK Singles Chart in April 1963, one of four visits to that chart. It was followed by "Black Land Farmer". In 1959, he became morning man at KHJ in Los Angeles, California, moving a year later to the morning show at KRLA and finally to KFWB in 1962. He also had lengthy stays at KGIL from 1968 to 1971, KKGO/KJQI and Gene Autry's KMPC (now KSPN-AM) from 1971 to 1979 and again from 1983 to 1987, the short-lived "Wink and Bill Show" on KABC during 1989, and KJQI from 1993 to 1994. In 1967, Martindale acted in a short futuristic documentary film about home life in the year 1999 produced by the Philco-Ford Corporation which predicted, among other things, Internet commerce.

Television

Martindale's first break into television was at WHBQ-TV in Memphis, as the host of Mars Patrol, a science-fiction themed children's television program. At his tenure with WHBQ, Martindale became the host of the TV show Teenage Dance Party, where his friend Elvis Presley made an appearance on 16 June 1956. (Following Presley's death in 1977, Martindale aired a nationwide tribute radio special in his honor).

Martindale's first game-show hosting job was on the show What's This Song?, which he hosted for NBC (credited as "Win Martindale") from 1964 to 1965. From 1970 to 1971, he hosted a similar song-recognition game show, Words and Music, again on NBC. His first major success came in 1972, when he took the emcee position on a new CBS game show, Gambit. He spent four years hosting the original Gambit and later hosted a Las Vegas-based revival for 13 months in 1980–81.

The emcee role for which Martindale is most widely known is on Tic-Tac-Dough. He was tapped by Barry & Enright Productions to host the revived series in 1978 and stayed until 1985, presiding over one of the more popular game shows of the day. During this time, Martindale decided to branch out and form his own production company, Wink Martindale Enterprises, so he could develop and produce his own game shows. His first venture was Headline Chasers, a co-production with Merv Griffin that premiered in 1985; Martindale had left Tic-Tac-Dough to host his creation, but the show did not meet with any success and was cancelled after its only season in 1986. Martindale's next venture was more successful, as he created, and along with Barry & Enright, co-produced the Canadian game show Bumper Stumpers for Global Television and USA Network. This series aired on both American and Canadian television from 1987 until 1990. In 1986, he launched a partnership with producer Jerry Gilden, Martindale/Gilden Productions, and it started off with a game show development contract with CBS. In 1988, Martindale/Gilden Productions secured the licensing rights from Parker Brothers to develop game shows based on Parker-owned properties such as Boggle.

After hosting two short-lived Merrill Heatter-produced game shows (a revival of High Rollers and the Canadian The Last Word), Martindale went back into producing and launched The Great Getaway Game on Travel Channel in 1990. Two years after that program went off the air, Martindale teamed up with Bill Hillier and The Family Channel to produce a series of "interactive" game shows that put an emphasis on home viewers being able to play along from home and win prizes. Four series were commissioned and Martindale served as host for all four. The first to premiere, on June 7, 1993, was Trivial Pursuit, an adaptation of the popular trivia-based board game. On March 7, 1994, the list-based Shuffle and Boggle, another board-game adaptation, premiered and were very different from Trivial Pursuit, which was presented more in a traditional game-show style. These two programs, along with the Jumble-based show that replaced Shuffle on June 13, 1994, after its initial 14-week run ended, were played more like the interactive games for the home viewers that were the focus of the block. Except for Trivial Pursuit, none of the interactive games were much of a success; Boggle ended on November 18, 1994, while Jumble came to an end on December 30, 1994. Trivial Pursuit ended on the same day as Jumble, but continued to air in reruns for some time afterward, finally being removed from the Family Channel schedule in July 1995.

In June 1996, Martindale became host of Lifetime's highest-rated quiz show, Debt, which had debt-ridden contestants compete to try to eliminate their debts. Despite its popularity on cable, Debt was cancelled in 1998, for the reason more males were watching the show than females (the network's target audience). Martindale did not host another game show for over a decade.

Later career
On June 2, 2006, Martindale received a star on the Hollywood Walk of Fame. In 2007, he became a member of the nominating committee of the Hit Parade Hall of Fame. On October 13, 2007, Martindale was one of the first inductees into the American TV Game Show Hall of Fame in Las Vegas.

Martindale was one of the hosts featured in the 2002 NBC special Most Outrageous Game Show Moments, alongside Bob Eubanks, Jim Lange, Ben Stein, and Peter Marshall, but was not featured in any of the subsequent episodes ordered by the network.

Martindale has appeared in various TV commercials, including a stint as a pitchman for the travel website Orbitz. Until 2007, Martindale had a daily three-hour show on the syndicated Music of Your Life format, which is heard on around 200 radio stations. On June 2, 2009, Martindale signed with the syndicated Hit Parade Radio format. The format began operation on February 7, 2010, with Martindale as afternoon drive personality.  The syndicator stopped operating on June 6, 2010.

In 2008, Wink appeared on GSN Live, an interstitial program during the afternoon block of classic game show reruns. Several times during 2008, Martindale filled in for Fred Roggin on GSN Live while Roggin was on vacation. Martindale's last program was the GSN original series Instant Recall, which premiered on March 4, 2010. Instant Recall was the first show Martindale has hosted since Debt aired on Lifetime from 1996 to 1998.

In 2012, Martindale returned to radio, as host of The 100 Greatest Christmas Hits of All Time. The nationally syndicated show is produced by Envision Radio Networks.

In 2013, Martindale made a guest appearance on The Eric Andre Show; in an appearance typical for the show, he did the interview dressed in a motion-capture suit (at one point being, rather poorly, mocapped dancing), sang a song teaching kids their "Jamaican ABCs", and promoted a drinkable mouthwash, called Scoap (pronounced "sco-app".)

In 2014, Martindale started his own YouTube channel featuring episodes of game shows, game show pilots, rare clips from various game shows, and more.

Martindale made a special guest appearance on the December 2, 2014, episode of the GSN show The Chase hosted by Brooke Burns and featuring Mark Labbett.

In October 2016, Martindale appeared on the daytime soap opera The Bold and the Beautiful, as a minister.

On April 21, 2017, Martindale appeared in a KFC advertising campaign featuring Rob Lowe as astronaut Colonel Sanders giving a JFK speech spoof/homage about launching the Zinger chicken sandwich into space.

On April 4, 2018, Martindale served as "surprise co-host" (via phone) for Sirius XM NHL Network Radio's "Three Questions" segment where a celebrity co-host creates the questions and then quizzes the show's broadcast crew.

On January 28, 2021, Martindale claimed on his Facebook that he had one of the pilots for the ABC version of Deal or No Deal and would upload it when his YouTube channel hit 18,000 subscribers. When he hit his goal on July 19, the pilot got uploaded to his channel.

On June 6, 2021, Martindale began hosting the nationally and internationally syndicated The History of Rock 'n' Roll, a two-hour weekend look back at music from the 1960s, 1970s and 1980s.  The production is created by a team composed of Martindale, producer/engineer Peter Jay Gould of The Intervale Group, and writer/producer Gary Theroux, who wrote and produced the 1978 52-hour marathon version of The History of Rock 'n' Roll for Drake-Chenault. The new richly-produced series combines songs, fun facts about the music and the artists, and artist interview soundbites.

Personal life 
Martindale married Madelyn Leech in 1954 and they had four children. They divorced in 1972. He married his second wife, Sandy (née Ferra), on August 2, 1975.

He has a few dogs named after the various game shows he hosted.

Martindale is a born-again Christian and was once a guest on the TBN flagship program Praise the Lord. He has also previously endorsed several conservative positions politically. Wink's wife, Sandy, previously dated Elvis Presley, and both were friends of his. They have appeared on Sirius' Elvis Radio and shared stories about Presley.

In popular culture
New York Giants defensive coordinator Don Martindale goes by the nickname "Wink”, which he got because he shares a last name with the game show host.

References

External links

 
 
 

1933 births
Male actors from Tennessee
American game show hosts
American radio DJs
California Republicans
Dot Records artists
Living people
OJ Records artists
People from Jackson, Tennessee
Radio personalities from Memphis, Tennessee
University of Memphis alumni
Television producers from Tennessee